is a Japanese jazz bassist and record producer.

Early life
Nakamura was born in Tokyo on 3 March 1942. Everyone in his immediate family were artists. He studied at Nihon University before moving to New York in 1964. He studied there with Reggie Workman.

Later life and career
Nakamura in 1969 joined drummer Roy Haynes's ensemble; that same year he also formed a band with Steve Grossman and Lenny White, who both went on to play on his debut as a leader, 1973's Unicorn. Nakamura played both acoustic and electric bass on the album, which was recorded in 1973 and released by Three Blind Mice.

Nakamura formed the Rising Sun band in the mid-1970s. In 1977 this contained saxophonist Bob Mintzer, guitarist Shiro Mori, with Mark Gray on synthesizer, Art Gore on drums and Nobu Urushiyama on percussion. "Nakamura worked principally as a record producer in the 1980s and 1990s."

Discography

As leader
Unicorn (Three Blind Mice, 1973)
Rising Sun (Polydor, 1976)
Manhattan Special (Polydor, 1977)
Songs of the Birds (Kitty, 1977)
Big Apple (Agharta, 1979)
Teruo Nakamura & Rising Sun Band at Carnegie Hall (Agharta, 1979)
Route 80 (Agharta, 1980)
Super Friends (Eastworld, 1985)
Wind Smile (Pony Canyon, 1990)
Red Shoes (Avex, 2001)

As sideman
With Roy Haynes
Hip Ensemble (Mainstream, 1971)
Togyu (RCA, 1975)
With Tsuyoshi Yamamoto
P.S. I Love You (Toshiba EMI, 1980)

Main source:

References

1942 births
Japanese jazz musicians
Living people
Musicians from Tokyo